Stronger Thru the Years is a compilation album by Cliff Richard, released in 2017.

Track listing
Disc 1
"Stronger Than That" (Alan Tarney)
"Miss You Nights" (Dave Townsend)
"The Next Time" (with The Shadows) (Buddy Kaye, Philip Springer)
"Dreamin'" (Leo Sayer, Alan Tarney)
"Joanna" (Chris Eaton)
"It's All in the Game" (Charles Dawes, Carl Sigman)
"The Minute You're Gone" (Jimmy Gateley)
"The Day I Met Marie" (Hank Marvin)
"Living Doll" (with The Drifters) (Lionel Bart)
"Travellin' Light" (with The Shadows) (Roy Bennett, Sid Tepper)
"Please Don't Tease" (with The Shadows) (Peter Chester, Bruce Welch)
"I Just Don't Have the Heart" (Matt Aitken, Mike Stock, Pete Waterman)
"Fall in Love with You" (with The Shadows) (Ian Ralph Samwell)
"I Love You" (with The Shadows) (Bruce Welch)
"Clear Blue Skies" (Dave Cook, Chris Turner)
"The Young Ones" (with The Shadows) (Roy Bennett, Sid Tepper)
"Summer Holiday" (with The Shadows) (Brian Bennett, Roy Bennett, Bruce Welch)
"Always Guaranteed" (Alan Tarney)
"Don't Talk to Him" (with The Shadows) (Cliff Richard, Bruce Welch)

Disc 2
"When the Girl in Your Arms Is the Girl in Your Heart" (Roy Bennett, Sid Tepper)
"Constantly" (Vincenzo D'Acquisto, Michael Julien, Saverio Seracini)
"Remember Me" (Alan Tarney)
"The Twelfth of Never" (Jerry Livingston, Paul Francis Webster)
"I Could Easily Fall (In Love with You)" (with The Shadows) (Brian Bennett, Hank Marvin, John Rostill, Bruce Welch)
"Wind Me Up (Let Me Go)" (Bob Montgomery, John Talley)
"Do You Wanna Dance" (with The Shadows) (Bobby Freeman)
"Devil Woman" (Terry Britten, Christine Sparkle)
"All My Love (Solo Tu)" (Federico Monti Arduini, Peter Callander)
"We Don't Talk Anymore" (Alan Tarney)
"She Means Nothing to Me" (with Phil Everly) (John David)
"Carrie" (Terry Britten, BA Robertson)
"Suddenly" [From the film Xanadu] (with Olivia Newton-John) (John Farrar)
"Sci-Fi" (Terry Britten, BA Robertson)
"All I Ask of You" (featuring Sarah Brightman (Andrew Lloyd Webber)
"The Best of Me" (David Foster, Jeremy Lubbock, Richard Marx)
"Monday Thru' Friday" (Terry Britten)
"Daddy's Home" (William Miller, James Sheppard)
"Rock 'n' Roll Juvenile" (Cliff Richard)

Charts and certifications

Weekly charts

Certifications

References

External links
 Stronger Thru the Years at AllMusic

Cliff Richard compilation albums
2017 compilation albums
Parlophone compilation albums
Albums produced by Alan Tarney
Albums produced by Stock Aitken Waterman